Abulchares (died 1068) was a Byzantine general of Arab origin who served as the catepan of Italy from 1064 until his death. The chief sources for his catapanate are Skylitzes Continuatus and Anonymi Barensis Chronicon. Skylitzes Continuatus records that Abulchares was also duke (doux) of Dyrrhachium across the Adriatic, but this is chronologically impossible, since Perenos is recorded as duke at this time.

Abulchares arrived in southern Italy in 1064, when the Normans were in control of much of the former Catepanate. His task was to travel about Apulia shoring up the defences of the scattered towns still loyal to the Byzantines. In 1064, he took Herman of Hauteville as a hostage for the loyalty of his brother, Abelard of Hauteville, who had rebelled with Byzantine support against their uncle, Duke Robert Guiscard, over a disputed inheritance. The rebellion was quickly put down. In 1066 an army was sent to Italy under Maurex and by 1067 he had recaptured the Norman-occupied cities of Brindisi and Taranto. Abulchares appointed strategoi equipped with reinforcements to defend the towns. Nikephoros Karantenos, the strategos who defended Brindisi from the Normans in 1070, may have been one of Abulchares' appointees. By 1068, Otranto had also been recovered.

Abulchares died in 1068, the same year as the former catepan Argyrus. Their deaths were a blow to the Byzantines. After his death, Bari, which he had resupplied, was besieged and taken by the Normans under Robert Guiscard. Perenos was appointed catepan, but was unable to cross the sea. According to Amatus of Montecassino, a catepan named Avartutele came to Bari in 1069 and sent for a relief force. There is no other record of a catepan of this name, and it may be an error for Abulchares, who was already dead when the siege began.

Notes

References

Sources

1068 deaths
11th-century catepans of Italy
Byzantine people of Arab descent
Byzantine people of the Byzantine–Norman wars